Waipuku is a settlement in inland Taranaki, in the western North Island of New Zealand. It is located between Stratford and Inglewood (between Midhirst and Tariki) on State Highway 3.

Further reading

General historical works

Within  in New Plymouth, there is an 1874 letter (signed by Octavius Carrington of the Public Works Office [and brother of ]),  upon the progress of Mountain Road, from Hawera northward toward New Plymouth: up to the Waipuku River (actually Stream). There is also a report (from Charles Hursthouse) upon progress on this  road in this and in the Huirangi districts. See

Maps

There is a 1905 map of the stretch of the North Egmont Branch Railway (that operated from 1906-1941) spanning the  stretch from York Road (just north of the Manganui River, north of Midhirst) to the Waipuku Stream (just south of Tariki). It may be found within  in New Plymouth, see 

 Scale: 1: 2 500 (i.e. 1/25.3 in. to the mile)

Stratford District, New Zealand
Populated places in Taranaki